Mackinac College was a private liberal arts college which opened on Mackinac Island, Michigan, in the fall of 1966 and closed four years later in 1970. The college taught courses in biology, chemistry, physics, psychology, modern languages, theater, television, radio, journalism, art, government, and public affairs. The college offered professional degrees.

Beginnings 
In 1964, journalist Peter Howard of the Moral Re-Armament (MRA) movement proposed the idea of converting the MRA camp at Mackinac Island, which stood unused for a large portion of the year, into a college campus. His proposal was to create a high-level school institution to educate young adults for the 21st century to play key roles in international relations, modern languages, theater, television, radio, journalism, art, government, and public affairs. The college planned to offer professional degrees in these fields. The school was granted a charter from the state of Michigan in 1965.

The MRA deeded its headquarters on the island and the Old Mission House to Mackinac College. The first class was admitted in 1966, due to graduate in 1970, consisted of 113 students from 30 states and Canada. The charter class of freshmen students were put in temporary classroom facilities on September 15 in the new Peter Howard Memorial Library building on the beach at Cedar Point until the college facilities were finished. Optical physicist Samuel Douglas Cornell resigned from his 12 year position as an executive manager of the National Academy of Sciences to become the school's president.

A gift of $1,500,000 from a Mr and Mrs William Van Alan Clark of New York City for construction and equipping of the main classroom-laboratory building of Mackinac College was announced by the board trustees in the first week of May 1966. It had completion scheduled for August 1967. The donor was an honorary chairman of the board of Avon Products. The donor and his wife had discussed the need for an academic center with Cornell on several occasions. The concept evolved of a science center being integrated with the college's existing fine arts facility. The new center housed 20 classrooms, 13 seminar study areas, a lecture hall capable of seating 300, faculty offices, and laboratories for biology, chemistry, physics, psychology, and languages. The new arts and science center, designed by a well-known architectural firm of Little Rock, Arkansas, was planned to harmonize with the existing college buildings and with the surrounding wooded lake shore area where the campus was.

Operations 

During its operations, Mackinac College had a liberal arts focus (unlike the MRA's College of the Good Road which focused on teaching ideology of the MRA), and joined in with the "radical critique of traditional higher education" which was happening in the 1960s, although the MRA was generally strongly opposed to most of the ideals of the 1960s counter culture. Students participated in the creation of the curriculum, but were not allowed to date which caused discord and unrest with some clandestine activity.

The college held its first and final commencement exercises of 29 seniors receiving Bachelor of Arts degrees on June 20, 1970. The exercises were held in the Great Hall of the college that was preceded by the traditional academic procession that included some 20 members of the present and past faculties. All former faculty members of the college were invited to take part in the commencement ceremony. Cornell directed the exercises, which began with a message of greeting from the chairman of the board of trustees. The students chose not to have the regular commencement address and instead some of the students spoke briefly during the exercises.

Closing and legacy 
The school closed at the end of June 1970, four years after opening. The American School Board Journal cited the reasons for the closure as being "familiar": the high costs of setting up the campus and programs, a smaller enrollment than planned and a lack of alumni to fund endowments. After closing, the campus was sold to Cathedral of Tomorrow, founded by Rex Humbard who reopened Mackinac College in 1972 as a bible college under the same name. The campus was sold in 1977 to a Dallas-based real estate development firm which transformed it into the Mackinac Hotel & Conference Center. The property was again sold in 1987 and redeveloped into the Mission Point Resort, with the Howard Library being torn down a few years later.

References

Sources 

1966 establishments in Michigan
1970 disestablishments in Michigan
1970s disestablishments in Michigan
Defunct private universities and colleges in Michigan
Educational institutions established in 1966
Mackinac Island